The Alter Botanischer Garten Hamburg (Old Botanical Garden Hamburg), sometimes also known as the Schaugewächshaus or the Tropengewächshäuser, is a botanical garden now consisting primarily of greenhouses in the Planten un Blomen park of Hamburg, Germany. Alter Botanischer Garten is located on the Hamburg Wallring at Stephansplatz and is open daily without charge.

Description

The garden is located on the site of Hamburg's old botanical garden at the city wall, established 1821 by Professor Johann Georg Christian Lehmann (1792–1860). Its alpine garden was established in 1903; most plants were subsequently moved to the new Botanischer Garten Hamburg in 1979. Herbal and medicinal plantings are clustered around the city's former moat. Today's gardens consist primarily of five interconnected greenhouses, total area 2,800 m², built 1962–1963 by architect Bernhard Hermkes (1903–1995), as follows:

 Schaugewächshaus (Show Greenhouse) - with a subtropical focus on the Mediterranean region and Canary Islands, South Africa, and sclerophyllous zones in California and southern Chile, containing trees such as laurel and olive, various coniferous trees such as Araucaria, palm trees, eucalyptus, and tree ferns.
 Farnhaus - ferns.
 Palmfarnhhaus - ancient plants described in 1834 by Professor Johann Georg Christian Lehmann (1792–1860).
 Succulent house - succulent plants from the dry regions, particularly the semi-deserts of Africa and the Americas.
 Tropical house - about 800 m² area, maximum height of 13 meters, containing tropical plants from throughout the world, with a focus on South American plants and tropical crops.

The garden contains special collections of Aizoaceae (30,000 accessions representing about 1,500 species), Orchidaceae (about 2,500 accessions), Bambusoideae, Begoniaceae, Bromeliaceae, Cycadaceae, Masdevallia, Piperaceae, and Zingiberaceae.

See also 
 Dammtor
 Botanischer Garten Hamburg
 List of botanical gardens in Germany

References

External links 

 Hermann von Helmholtz-Zentrum entry #1
 Hermann von Helmholtz-Zentrum entry #2
 BGCI entry
 Citysam entry
 Wikimapia entry

Hamburg, Alter Botanischer Garten
Alter Botanischer Garten Hamburg
Buildings and structures in Hamburg-Mitte

de:Planten un Blomen